Callaghan v. Myers, 128 U.S. 617 (1888), was a United States Supreme Court ruling dealing with copyright. The firm of Eugene B. Myers & Chandler, composed of Myers and Horace P. Chandler, purchased the copyright of the arrangement of a number of Illinois Supreme Court records compiled by Norman L. Freeman. They printed these works, the Illinois Reports volumes 32 through 38, from 1865 to 1867. Myers alone held the copyright to Freeman's arrangements of volumes 39 through 46 and printed those as well.

The conflict began when Myers made some changes to the arrangement of volumes 37 and 38 and published them, observing the procedure to procure copyright on these alternative works. The defendants, Callaghan & Company, offered to purchase licenses to publish these new versions of 37 and 38, but would not pay Myers's price. Instead, they made very minor changes to Myers's version, copying essentially verbatim the portions of the book that were actually copyrightable, and published it as their own work. Myers sued them for copyright infringement and the case eventually went to the Supreme Court.

The Court upheld earlier case law, such as Banks v. Manchester, that said court documents belonged to the public domain. In regards to the case at hand, they ruled that the elements of the books that organized or summarized those judicial works constituted intellectual effort and therefore Myers did hold the copyright because he did follow the copyrighting procedures in all cases except one. The Court found that the copies of Volume 32 required for formally copyrighting the work had arrived late, so that volume was not copyrighted. Nonetheless, the plaintiff, Myers, was entitled to compensation in full for the infringement damages, if he chose to collect them.

References

External links
 

1888 in United States case law
United States Supreme Court cases
United States copyright case law
United States Supreme Court cases of the Fuller Court